Wu Chunmiao (born 1984) is a Paralympian athlete from China competing mainly in category T11 sprint events.

Wu was born in 1984, and became blind at the age of 10. At the 2004 Summer Paralympics, Wu competed in the T12 400m, and won a silver medal in the T11 100m and a gold in the T11 200m. She competed in the 2008 Summer Paralympics in Beijing, China. There she won a gold medal in the women's 100 metres – T11 event and a silver medal in the women's 200 metres – T11 event. She took the Paralympic Oath for athletes at the 2008 Summer Paralympics in Beijing.

References

External links 
 

1984 births
Living people
Paralympic athletes of China
Athletes (track and field) at the 2004 Summer Paralympics
Medalists at the 2004 Summer Paralympics
Athletes (track and field) at the 2008 Summer Paralympics
Medalists at the 2008 Summer Paralympics
Paralympic gold medalists for China
Paralympic silver medalists for China
Chinese female sprinters
Athletes from Qingdao
Runners from Shandong
Paralympic medalists in athletics (track and field)
21st-century Chinese women